Aurélien Joachim (born 10 August 1986) is a Luxembourgish professional footballer who plays for RUS Ethe Belmont as a striker. He is the younger brother of former cyclist Benoît Joachim. Between 2005 and 2019 he made 80 appearances for the Luxembourg scoring 15 goals.

Club career
Joachim spent his time in the youth teams of Belgian clubs Virton and Mouscron, before making his senior debut for Virton in the 2004–2005 season. He then played for the reserve teams of German Bundesliga sides VfL Bochum and Alemannia Aachen before making his debut in the Luxembourg National Division in the second half of the 2007–2008 season.

Joachim was transferred to F91 Dudelange in May 2011. He has been a key figure in Dudelange's Champions League run in 2012–13, scoring 4 goals over 2 legs against S.P. Tre Penne of San Marino, and scoring in each leg of Dudelange's famous 4–4 aggregate draw with Red Bull Salzburg, helping his side through via the away goals rule to face NK Maribor in the third qualifying round, the furthest Dudelange have ever gone in the Champions League.

On 29 August 2012, Joachim was loaned to Willem II until the end of the season. In July 2013, he signed a two-year deal with RKC Waalwijk after he had permanently left Dudelange as a free agent.

Before the beginning of the 2014–15 season, Joachim signed with Bulgarian club CSKA Sofia. He made his official debut for the side in a Europa League qualifier against Zimbru Chișinău on 17 July 2014. He played his last match for the "redmen" in April 2015, as he had to return to Luxembourg in order to undergo a meniscus operation.

After one season with Virton, Joachim confirmed that he had been relegated to the club's B-team because he was not a part of the club's plans. However, he was promoted back to the first team at the end of October 2019.

Joachim returned to FC Differdange 03 in July 2020.

International career
Joachim made his debut for Luxembourg in a September 2005 World Cup qualification match against Liechtenstein, at just 19 years of age. In his senior career, Joachim earned 80 caps, scoring 15 goals.

Joachim announced his retirement from international football in July 2020.

Career statistics

International

Scores and results list Luxembourg's goal tally first, score column indicates score after each Joachim goal.

References

External links
 
 Voetbal International profile 

1986 births
Living people
Association football forwards
Luxembourgian footballers
Luxembourg international footballers
Luxembourgian expatriate footballers
VfL Bochum II players
FC Differdange 03 players
Lierse S.K. players
Willem II (football club) players
RKC Waalwijk players
R.E. Virton players
PFC CSKA Sofia players
Burton Albion F.C. players
F91 Dudelange players
Eredivisie players
First Professional Football League (Bulgaria) players
Expatriate footballers in Germany
Luxembourgian expatriate sportspeople in Germany
Expatriate footballers in the Netherlands
Luxembourgian expatriate sportspeople in the Netherlands
Expatriate footballers in Bulgaria